KMF Bajo Pivljanin is a futsal club based in Plužine, Montenegro.

Honours 
Montenegrin Futsal League: 
Champions 2010/11
Vicechampions 2020/21

UEFA Club Competitions Record

UEFA Futsal Cup

See also
Futsal in Montenegro

External links
UEFA profile

Futsal clubs in Montenegro